Sarah Thomas may refer to:
 Sarah Thomas (centenarian) (1788-1897), Welsh centenarian
 Sarah Thomas (writer) (born 1934), Indian writer
 Sarah Thomas (actress) (born 1952), British actress
 Sarah Thomas (teacher), head of Bryanston School
 Sarah Thomas (librarian), American librarian, Bodley's Librarian, University of Oxford
 Sarah Thomas (field hockey) (born 1981), Welsh field hockey player
 Sarah Thomas (American football official) (born 1973), the first woman hired as a full-time NFL official
 Sarah Thomas (badminton) (born 1992), Welsh badminton player
 Sarah Thomas (marathon swimmer) (born 1981 or 1982), American marathon swimmer
 Sarah Thomas (model) (born 1980), English model
 Sarah Thomas (born 1969), married name of British swimmer Sarah Hardcastle

See also
Sara Thomas (born 1941), American politician